Highway bridge may refer to:

Highway Bridge (Potomac River)
Any bridge traversed by a highway

See also
 Lincoln Highway Bridge (disambiguation)
 Highway 2 Bridge, a bridge over the Kansas River in De Soto, Kansas
 
 Highway Ridge